Conegar Hill is a prominent rise,  high, just north of the village of Broadwindsor in the Yeovil Scarplands, in the county of Dorset in southern England.

The actual summit is unwooded and bounded to the east and west by tributaries of the River Axe and to the south by the Broadwindsor col to Waddon Hill. To the north is Blagdon Hill, a subsummit on the same ridge. The B3164 from Broadwindsor crosses the southeastern flank of Conegar Hill to join the A 3066 at Whetley Cross 2 kilometres to the northeast. A small lane, branches off northwards across the western side of the hill.

The name "Conegar" derives from the early Medieval English term "cony-garth" literally meaning rabbit yard. The name was chosen as the hill was possibly the remnants of an ancient man-made pillow mound, used for raising rabbits or because of the close resemblance to a pillow mound.

References 

Hills of Dorset